Conal Ó Gráda (born in Cork 1961) is an Irish flute and tin whistle player and teacher.

Career
Conal's debut recording The Top of Coom in 1990 is still regarded as a seminal recording of flute-playing. Conal has played, toured and recorded with many of the music's leading exponents and his second recording Cnoc Buí was released in 2008 to widespread critical acclaim.

As well as playing regularly with fiddler Maeve Donnelly, Conal is also a member of the group Raw Bar Collective, along with Offaly fiddler Dave Sheridan and Benny McCarthy of Danú fame.

Discography
The Top of Coom Claddagh 1990

Cnoc Buí 2008

An Bodhrán with Colm Murphy

References

External links
 Official site

1961 births
20th-century Irish people
21st-century Irish people
Irish flautists
Irish tin whistle players
People from County Cork
Living people
Claddagh Records artists